Zechariah 6 is the sixth of the total 14 chapters in the Book of Zechariah in the Hebrew Bible or the Old Testament of the Christian Bible. This book contains the prophecies attributed to the prophet Zechariah, and is a part of the Book of the Twelve Minor Prophets. This chapter contains the description of the eighth vision and the crowning of Joshua. It is a part of a section (so-called "First Zechariah") consisting of Zechariah 1–8.

Text
The original text was written in the Hebrew language. This chapter is divided into 15 verses.

Textual witnesses
Some early manuscripts containing the text of this chapter in Hebrew are of the Masoretic Text, which includes the Codex Cairensis (from year 895), the Petersburg Codex of the Prophets (916), and Codex Leningradensis (1008). Fragments containing parts of this chapter were found among the Dead Sea Scrolls, that is, 4Q80 (4QXIIe; 75–50 BCE) with extant verses 1–5.

There is also a translation into Koine Greek known as the Septuagint, made in the last few centuries BCE. Extant ancient manuscripts of the Septuagint version include Codex Vaticanus (B; B; 4th century), Codex Sinaiticus (S; BHK: S; 4th century), Codex Alexandrinus (A; A; 5th century) and Codex Marchalianus (Q; Q; 6th century).

Vision of the four chariots (6:1–8)
This section records the eighth (and last) vision in the series which forms an indusio with the first, focusing on the pacifying of the north country, the direction where the majority of attacks on Israel came from (cf. Jeremiah 1:14).

Verse 5
And the angel answered and said to me, “These are four spirits of heaven, who go out from their station before the Lord of all the earth."
"Spirits of heaven": or "winds of heaven" (MEV). The Hebrew word for "spirit" may also mean "wind" or "breath" depending on the context (cf. ASV, NRSV, CEV "the four winds of heaven").

The command to crown Joshua (6:9–15)
Following the eight visions, this section provides a closure of the cycle by describing the crowning of Joshua as a 'messianic' leader.

Verse 11
Then take silver and gold, and make crowns,
and set them upon the head of Joshua the son of Josedech, the high priest;
 "Make crowns": Zechariah was to get the crowns made (compare , passim). Here Joshua may symbolize 'a Person in whom the offices of priest and king were united' (cf. Psalm 110; in  Jesus (= "Joshua" in Hebrew) is said to wear many crowns on his head, referring to 'a diadem composed of many circlets'), because a high priest's "mitre" (made of the plate or "flower" of pure gold with the engraving "Holiness to the Lord" ) is never called a crown, but what to be set on Joshua's head is a royal crown.

Verse 12
 And speak unto him, saying, Thus speaketh the Lord of hosts, saying,
 Behold the man whose name is The Branch;
 and he shall grow up out of his place,
 and he shall build the temple of the Lord:
 "Behold, the man": This phrase is used in a speech to draw attention to someone different from the one in conversation (cf. ), so Joshua here is not the Branch (the Sprout figure), but that figure is 'accessible and approaching' the scene. Pilate spoke similar words regarding Jesus, "Behold the man" (John 19:5).
 "He shall build the temple of the Lord": In the time of Zechariah, the temple was soon to be finished by Zerubbabel, to whom this had been promised, not by Joshua the High Priest, but then a new temple is to be built from the foundation, of which the builder is to be "the foundation", as said, "on this rock I will build My Church"; and in him "all the building, fitly framed together0, groweth unto an holy temple to the Lord".

See also
 Four Horsemen of the Apocalypse
 Joshua the High Priest
Related Bible parts: Isaiah 4, Isaiah 11, Isaiah 54, Jeremiah 23, Jeremiah 33, Haggai 1, Zechariah 1, Zechariah 2, Zechariah 3, Zechariah 4, Zechariah 5, Revelation 6

Notes

References

Sources

External links

Jewish
Zechariah 6 Hebrew with Parallel English
Zechariah 6 Hebrew with Rashi's Commentary

Christian
Zechariah 6 English Translation with Parallel Latin Vulgate 

06